John Sheldon Doud Eisenhower (August 3, 1922 – December 21, 2013) was a United States Army officer, diplomat, and military historian. He was a son of President Dwight D. Eisenhower and First Lady Mamie Eisenhower. His military career spanned from before, during, and after his father's presidency, and he left active duty in 1963 and then retired in 1974. From 1969 to 1971, Eisenhower served as United States Ambassador to Belgium during the administration of President Richard Nixon, who was previously his father's vice president and also father to Eisenhower's daughter-in-law.

Early life and education 
John Sheldon Doud Eisenhower was born on August 3, 1922, at Denver General Hospital in Denver, Colorado, to future U.S. President and United States Army General of the Army Dwight D. Eisenhower and his wife, Mamie; he was their second child. Their elder son, Doud, known affectionately as "Icky", died in 1921, at age three, after contracting scarlet fever. Eisenhower, like his father, attended the United States Military Academy, graduating on June 6, 1944, the day of the Normandy landings, which his father was commanding. He later earned an M.A. degree in English and comparative literature from Columbia University in 1950,  and taught in the English Department at West Point from 1948 to 1951. Eisenhower graduated from the Army Command and General Staff College in 1955.

Military career 
Eisenhower served in the U.S. Army during World War II and the Korean War, remaining on active duty until 1963; then serving in the U.S. Army Reserve until retirement in 1975 – attaining the rank of brigadier general. A decorated soldier, Eisenhower found his World War II military career thwarted by fears for his safety and concern from the top brass that his death or capture would be a distraction to his father, the Supreme Allied Commander. During World War II, he was assigned to intelligence and administrative duties. This issue arose again in 1952 when Major Eisenhower was assigned to fight in a combat unit in Korea while his father ran for president. But unlike World War II, John was able to see combat in Korea. After seeing combat with an infantry battalion, he was reassigned to the 3rd Division headquarters.

Government career 
During his father's presidency, John Eisenhower served as Assistant Staff Secretary in the White House, on the Army's General Staff, and in the White House as assistant to General Andrew Goodpaster.

In the administration of President Richard Nixon, who had been his father's vice president, he served as U.S. Ambassador to Belgium from 1969 to 1971. In 1972, President Nixon appointed Eisenhower Chairman of the Interagency Classification Review Committee. In 1975, he served President Gerald Ford as chairman of the President's Advisory Committee on Refugees.

Later life and writing 
As a military historian, Eisenhower wrote several books, including The Bitter Woods, a study of the Battle of the Bulge, and So Far from God, a history of the Mexican–American War. In a New York Times review of the latter, historian Stephen W. Sears remarked that Eisenhower "writes briskly and authoritatively, and his judgments are worth reading." Eisenhower wrote Zachary Taylor: The American Presidents Series: The 12th President, 1849–1850 (2008). John Eisenhower also wrote the forewords to Borrowed Soldiers, by Mitchell Yockelson of the U.S. National Archives, and to Kenneth W. Rendell's Politics, War and Personality: 50 Iconic Documents of World War II.

In later years, he had been an opponent of Frank Gehry's proposed design for the National Dwight D. Eisenhower Memorial, which he said was "too extravagant" and "attempts to do too much."

Presidential elections 
A lifelong Republican, Eisenhower voted for Democrat John Kerry in the 2004 Presidential election, citing dissatisfaction with Republican incumbent George W. Bush's management of U.S. foreign policy.

During the 2008 presidential election, in which presidential candidate John McCain and vice presidential candidates Sarah Palin and Joe Biden all had children enlisted in the armed forces, he wrote about his wartime experience as the son of a sitting president in a cautionary opinion piece in The New York Times entitled "Presidential Children Don't Belong in Battle".

Death 
Eisenhower died at Trappe, Maryland, on December 21, 2013. From the death of Elizabeth Ann Blaesing in 2005 until his own death, Eisenhower was the oldest living presidential child; on his death that distinction passed to Lynda Bird Johnson, who still holds it as of 2023. His burial was at West Point Cemetery on the grounds of the United States Military Academy.

Marriage and children 
Eisenhower married Barbara Jean Thompson on June 10, 1947, only a few days before her twenty-first birthday. Barbara was born on June 15, 1926, in Fort Knox, Kentucky, into an Army family. She was the daughter of Col. Percy Walter Thompson (1898–1974) by his wife Beatrice (née Birchfield). Col. Thompson was commander of the Allied Expeditionary Forces. The Eisenhowers had four children:
 Dwight David Eisenhower II (b. 1948, West Point, New York), who married Julie Nixon, herself a presidential daughter;
 (Barbara) Anne Eisenhower (1949–2022, born in West Point, New York);
 Susan Elaine Eisenhower (b. 1951, Fort Knox, Kentucky);
 Mary Jean Eisenhower (b. 1955, Washington, D.C.).

All of his daughters were presented as debutantes to high society at the prestigious International Debutante Ball at the Waldorf-Astoria Hotel in New York City.

John and Barbara divorced in 1986 after thirty-nine years of marriage. In 1988, Barbara married widower Edwin J. Foltz, a former vice president at the Campbell Soup Company. She died on September 19, 2014, in Gladwyne, Montgomery County, Pennsylvania.

In 1988, Eisenhower married Joanne Thompson. He lived in Trappe, Maryland, after moving there from Kimberton, Pennsylvania.

Military awards and decorations

Other honors 
The city of Marshfield, Missouri chose Eisenhower as a 2008 honoree of the Edwin P. Hubble Medal of Initiative. His grandson, Merrill Eisenhower Atwater spoke on his behalf at Marshfield's annual Cherry Blossom Festival. The medal recognizes individuals who demonstrate great initiative in their chosen field.

Dates of rank

Family tree

Bibliography

Notes

References

External links 

John Eisenhower – Internet Accuracy Project

1922 births
2013 deaths
Eisenhower family
United States Military Academy alumni
United States Army personnel of World War II
United States Military Academy faculty
Columbia Graduate School of Arts and Sciences alumni
United States Army personnel of the Korean War
United States Army Command and General Staff College alumni
American biographers
American military historians
Children of presidents of the United States
American male biographers
Maryland Republicans
Military personnel from Colorado
Military personnel from Pennsylvania
Nixon administration personnel
Pennsylvania Republicans
United States Army generals
Writers from Denver
Writers from Maryland
Writers from Pennsylvania
Ambassadors of the United States to Belgium
Burials at West Point Cemetery